The Queensland Law Society is the peak professional body for solicitors in Queensland, Australia.  It represents more than 9,000 members, and is affiliated with the Law Council of Australia.  The society provides support and public advocacy for the legal profession.

The society originated as an informal meeting of solicitors in Brisbane, on the 7th of August 1873, and was formalised as the "Queensland Law Association" in 1883.  In 1927, it was incorporated under the current name, the "Queensland Law Society".  In 1941, during difficult years when many lawyers were called to war, the society first engaged a full-time employee, Beryl Donkin, as secretary and chief administrative officer.   The society was enshrined by Act of Parliament in 1952.

In 1964 the society initiated the "Queensland Law Society Symposium".

See also
Bill Potts (lawyer)

References

 http://www.qls.com.au/About_QLS/Queensland_Law_Society/Our_history

External links
 http://www.qls.com.au/Home

Legal organisations based in Australia
New South Wales
Organizations established in 1883
1883 establishments in Australia